Settin' the Pace is an album by jazz musician John Coltrane, released in December 1961 by the Prestige label. It is assembled from previously unissued tracks from a recording session at the studio of Rudy Van Gelder in Hackensack, New Jersey in 1958. Coltrane on tenor saxophone is accompanied by Red Garland on piano, Paul Chambers on bass, and Art Taylor on drums. With Garland and Chambers, Coltrane had played together since at least October 1955 in Miles Davis' band. With Art Taylor they were part of the Tenor Conclave recordings in September 1956. As a quartet they had already recorded two albums for Prestige, John Coltrane with the Red Garland Trio and Soultrane. The material the quartet recorded on this session were extended interpretations of three popular songs and "Little Melonae", a classic bebop tune written by Jackie McLean. Of note is Coltrane's use of the sheets of sound technique, particularly on "Little Melonae".

Release history
As Coltrane's profile increased during the 1960s, Prestige released recordings without Coltrane's input or approval. The original mono recordings were not remastered in stereo until 1970 and released on Prestige's "Jazz Classic Series" as Trane's Reign (PRT 7746). Original Jazz Classics reissued the album again in 1983 on LP, then followed by its first digitally remastered CD release in 1987. A technically advanced remastering (XRCD) was produced by Akira Taguchi for JVC in 2008 with an additional bonus track.

Track listing
 "I See Your Face Before Me" (Howard Dietz, Arthur Schwartz) – 9:59
 "If There Is Someone Lovelier Than You" (Dietz, Schwartz) – 9:22
 "Little Melonae" (Jackie McLean) – 14:05
 "Rise 'n' Shine" (Buddy DeSylva, Vincent Youmans) – 7:16

2008 reissue bonus track
"By the Numbers" (Coltrane) – 12:00

Personnel
 John Coltrane – tenor saxophone
 Red Garland – piano
 Paul Chambers – bass 
 Art Taylor – drums

References

1961 albums
John Coltrane albums
Prestige Records albums